The Football League play-offs for the 1993–94 season were held in May 1994, with the finals taking place at Wembley Stadium in London. The play-off semi-finals were played over two legs and were contested by the teams who finished in 3rd, 4th, 5th and 6th place in the Football League First Division and Football League Second Division and the 4th, 5th, 6th and 7th placed teams in the Football League Third Division table. The winners of the semi-finals progressed through to the finals, with the winner of these matches gaining promotion for the following season.

Background
The Football League play-offs have been held every year since 1987. They take place for each division following the conclusion of the regular season and are contested by the four clubs finishing below the automatic promotion places.

First Division

After just missing out on the playoffs a year earlier, Millwall made a stronger challenge for promotion to the Premier League this time around, finishing third and qualifying for the playoffs. Leicester City, beaten finalists in the previous two seasons, qualified for the playoffs by finishing fourth. Tranmere Rovers, who had just missed out on a place in the League Cup final, made another strong challenge in the league and qualified for the playoffs for the second season running. The final playoff place went to Derby County.

The final ended up being an East Midlands clash as Leicester and Derby won in the semi-finals, and Leicester secured promotion after seven years outside the flight by winning the final 2-1 with both of their goals coming from long-serving Steve Walsh. The final was Leicester's seventh appearance at Wembley but the first game they had won there.

Semi-finals
First leg

Second leg

Leicester City won 2–1 on aggregate.

Derby County won 5–1 on aggregate.

Final

Second Division

Semi-finals
First leg

Second leg

Stockport County won 1–0 on aggregate.

Burnley won 3–1 on aggregate.

Final

Third Division

Semi-finals
First leg

Second leg

Preston North End won 4–3 on aggregate.

Wycombe Wanderers won 4–1 on aggregate.

Final

External links
Football League website

 
English Football League play-offs